The following is a complete discography of every album and single released by New Zealand-born Australian rock music artist Jon Stevens.

Studio albums

Soundtrack albums

Singles

As lead artist

As featured artist

References

Discographies of Australian artists
Discographies of New Zealand artists
Pop music discographies
Rock music discographies